Everything Must Change is the debut studio album by singer Randy Crawford released in 1976 on the Warner Bros. label.

Background
It was recorded and mixed at Hollywood Sound Recorders except "I'm Easy" and "I've Never Been To Me", which, along with all horns and strings, were recorded at The Hit Factory, New York City, and engineered by Kevin Herron with assistant engineer Ted Spencer. In addition "Everything Must Change" and "Gonna Give Lovin' A Try" were recorded live at the World Jazz Association's first recorded concert at the Shrine Auditorium in Los Angeles in November 1975.

Track listing
"Everything Must Change" (Benard Ighner) - 4:52
"I Let You Walk Away" (Neil Sedaka, Phil Cody) - 3:20
"I'm Easy" (Keith Carradine) - 3:41
"I Had to See You One More Time" (Norma Helms, Ken Hirsch) - 3:40
"I've Never Been to Me" (Ron Miller, Ken Hirsch) - 3:32
"Don't Let Me Down" (John Lennon, Paul McCartney) - 3:56
"Something So Right" (Paul Simon) - 4:12
"Soon as I Touched Him" (Norma Helms, Ken Hirsch) - 3:11
"Only Your Love Song Lasts" (Art Munson, Stephen Kalinich) - 4:06
"Gonna Give Lovin' a Try" (Diane Lampert, Peter Farrow, Nathaniel Adderley, Julian Adderley) - 3:24

Personnel
Randy Crawford - vocals
The World Jazz Association All Star Band
Joe Sample, Pat Rebillot - keyboards
Robert Popwell, Anthony Jackson - bass guitar
James Gadson, Rick Marotta - drums
Larry Carlton - acoustic guitar
Jay Graydon, Eric Gale, Hugh McCracken, Dean Parks - electric guitar
Ralph MacDonald - percussion
Hugh McCracken - harmonica
Harold Vick - tenor saxophone
Hugh Masekela - flugelhorn 
Alfred Brown, Gene Orloff, Harry Lookofsky, Harry Cykman, Joseph Malignaggi, Sanford Allen, Marvin Morganstern, Guy Lumia, Max Pollikof, Selwart Clarke, Jesse Levy, Kermit Moore - strings
Seldon Powell, William Slapin, Virgil Jones, Charles Williams, Harold Vick, Joseph Shepley, David Carey, Wayne Andre - horns

Production
Arrangers - Larry Carlton, William Eaton, Jimmy Jones
Produced by Stewart Levine for Outside Productions Inc.
Engineered and remixed by Rik Pekkonen
Photography - Lisa Powers
Design - Vartan Kurjian, Stan Evenson

References

1976 debut albums
Albums produced by Stewart Levine
Warner Records albums
Randy Crawford albums